Patrick Feyder (born 25 October 1971) is a retired Luxembourgian football defender.

References

1971 births
Living people
Luxembourgian footballers
FC Progrès Niederkorn players
Union Luxembourg players
Association football defenders
Luxembourg under-21 international footballers
Luxembourg international footballers